QP, Qp, or Qp may refer to:

Science, technology, and mathematics

Computing
 Quoted-printable, an encoding to send 8-bit data over 7-bit path '=09'
 QP (Quantum Platform), a framework for building real-time embedded applications

Medicine

 Qualified Person, a technical term used in European Union pharmaceutical regulation
 ATCvet code QP Antiparasitic products, insecticides and repellents, a section of the Anatomical Therapeutic Chemical Classification System for veterinary medicinal products

Mathematics

 Qp, the field of p-adic numbers
 Quadratic programming, a special type of mathematical optimization problem
 Quasi-polynomial time, relating to time complexity in computer science
 QP or EQP, Exact Quantum Polynomial time in computational complexity theory

Other uses
 qp ligature, a ligature of Latin
 Qp-Crazy, a Japanese hardcore punk and industrial metal band
 Quarter Pounder, a hamburger
 Qatar Petroleum (today QatarEnergy), an oil and gas company in Qatar